The 13th Secretariat of the Communist Party of Vietnam (CPV), formally the 13th Secretariat of the Central Committee of the Communist Party of Vietnam (Vietnamese: Ban Bí thư Ban Chấp hành Trung ương Đảng Cộng sản Việt Nam Khoá XIII), was partly elected by the 1st Session of the 13th Politburo and partly elected by the 1st Plenary Session of the 13th Central Committee in the immediate aftermath of the 13th National Congress. Nguyễn Phú Trọng was re-elected for his third term as General Secretary of the Communist Party of Vietnam, a position he has held since 2011.

Members

References

Bibliography

13th Secretariat of the Communist Party of Vietnam